Palpita triopis is a moth in the family Crambidae. It was described by George Hampson in 1912. It is found in Papua New Guinea.

References

Moths described in 1912
Palpita
Moths of New Guinea